The Old District Office North, or the Law Ting Pong Scout Centre, is a building located at 20 Wan Tau Kok Lane, Tai Po in the New Territories of Hong Kong, near the Old Tai Po Police Station.

The building was the headquarter of the colonial District Office of the whole New Territories. Since the 1920s, it only administrative the northern part of the New Territories, as the District Office South was established.

History
The Old District Office North was built around 1907 and was the earliest seat of the colonial civil administration of the New Territories. Administration and land registration of the northern part of the New Territories were carried out in this building. The building still housed a magistrate's court until 1961.

Conservation
The building was declared a monument on 13 November 1981. It is now used by the New Territories Eastern Region Headquarters of The Scout Association of Hong Kong.

References

External links

 Virtual Heritage Explorer: Old District Office North

Tai Po
Declared monuments of Hong Kong
Judiciary of Hong Kong
Scouting and Guiding in Hong Kong